esdesetat8uuyyu

Mukhtar Ansari (born 30 June 1963) is an Indian gangster and politician from Uttar Pradesh. He has been elected as a Member of the Legislative Assembly from the Mau constituency five times, including twice as a Bahujan Samaj Party candidate.

Early life 
Mukhtar Ansari is the grandson of Mukhtar Ahmed Ansari, an early president of the Indian National Congress.

In the early 1970s, the government commissioned several development projects in the backward Poorvanchal area. This resulted in the rise of organised gangs that competed with each other to grab the contracts for these projects. Mukhtar Ansari was originally an alleged member of the Makhanu Singh gang. In the 1980s, this gang clashed with another gang led by Sahib Singh, over a plot of land in Saidpur, resulting in a series of violent incidents. Brijesh Singh, an alleged member of Sahib Singh's gang, later formed his own gang and took over Ghazipur's contract work mafia in the 1990s. Ansari's gang competed with him for the control of the  100 crore contract business, which spanned areas such as coal mining, railway construction, scrap disposal, public works. The gangs were also allegedly involved in running protection ("goonda tax") and extortion rackets, besides other criminal activities such as kidnapping.

Early political career 

By the early 1990s, Mukhtar Ansari was well known for his alleged criminal activities, especially in the districts of Mau, Ghazipur, Varanasi and Jaunpur. He entered politics around 1995 through student union in Banaras Hindu University, became an MLA in 1996, and started challenging Brijesh Singh's dominance. The two became the main gang rivals in the Poorvanchal region. In 2002, Singh allegedly ambushed Ansari's convoy. Three of Ansari's men were killed in the resulting shootout. Brijesh Singh was critically injured and presumed dead. Ansari became the undisputed gang leader in Poorvanchal. However, Brijesh Singh was later found to be alive, and the feud resumed. To counter Ansari's political influence, Singh supported the election campaign of the BJP leader Krishnanand Rai. Rai defeated Mukhtar Ansari's brother and five-time MLA Afzal Ansari from the Mohammadabad in the 2002 Uttar Pradesh Assembly elections. Mukhtar Ansari later claimed that Rai used his political office to award all the contracts to Brijesh singh's gang, and the two planned to eliminate him.

Ansari used the Muslim votebank to ensure his victory during the elections in the Ghazipur-Mau area. The mix of crime, politics, and religion led to several instances of communal violence in the region. After one such riot, Mukhtar Ansari was arrested on the charge of inciting people towards violence. However he was acquitted by the Court in this matter.

While Ansari was lodged in the jail, Krishnanand Rai was shot dead in public along with his six aides. The attackers fired over 400 bullets from six AK-47 rifles; 67 bullets were recovered from the seven bodies. Shashikant Rai, an important witness in the case, he had identified Ansari and Bajrangi’s shooter who attacked Rai’s convoy, but later he was found dead under mysterious circumstances in 2006. The police dismissed his death as a suicide. Ansari's rival Brijesh Singh escaped from the Ghazipur-Mau area after Rai's murder. He was later arrested in 2008, in Orissa, and later entered politics as a member of the Pragatisheel Manav Samaj Party.

In 2008, Ansari ordered an attack on Dharmendra Singh, a witness in a murder case. However, later, the victim submitted an affidavit requesting the proceedings against Ansari to be dropped. On 27 September 2017, Ansari was acquitted of murder.

Bahujan Samaj Party 

Mukhtar Ansari and his brother Afzal joined the Bahujan Samaj Party (BSP) in 2007. The party allowed them in, after they claimed that they had been falsely framed in criminal cases for fighting against the "feudal system", and promised to refrain from participating in any crimes. The BSP chief Mayawati portrayed Mukhtar Ansari as Robin Hood and called him "a messiah of the poor". Ansari fought the 2009 Lok Sabha elections from Varanasi on a BSP ticket, while still lodged in the jail. He lost to BJP's Murli Manohar Joshi by a margin of 17,211 votes; he received 27.94% of the votes, compared to Joshi's 30.52%.

Mukhtar Ansari and two other persons were charge-sheeted for the murder of Kapil Dev Singh in April 2009. The police also found that he had ordered the murder of a contractor Ajay Prakash Singh in August 2009. In 2010, Ansari was booked for the murder of Ram Singh Maurya. Maurya was a witness to the murder of Mannat Singh, a local contractor allegedly killed by Ansari's gang in 2009.

The two brothers were expelled by BSP in 2010 after the party realized that they were still involved in criminal activities. A raid in Ghazipur jail, where he was lodged, had revealed that Mukhtar was living a luxurious life: items like air coolers and cooking equipment were found from his cell.

Quami Ekta Dal 

After being expelled from BSP and being rejected by other political parties, the Ansari brothers (Mukhtar and Afzal) formed their own political party called the Quami Ekta Dal (QED), in 2010. Earlier, Mukhtar had launched an outfit called the Hindu Muslim Ekta Party, which was merged with QED. In 2012, he was charged under the Maharashtra Control of Organised Crime Act for being a member of an organised crime syndicate.

In March 2014, Ansari announced that he will contest the 2014 Lok Sabha elections against Narendra Modi from Varanasi, besides contesting from Ghosi. However, in April, he withdrew his candidature stating that he wanted to prevent division of "secular votes".

Back in BSP 
On 26 January 2016, Ansari rejoined the Bahujan Samaj Party (BSP), before the 2017 Uttar Pradesh Legislative elections. There was widespread speculation about the Ansari brothers joining Samajwadi party a couple of months ago.  BSP chief Mayawati defended his entry into the party, stating that the criminal charges against Ansari had not been proven, and that the party gives people a chance to reform themselves.

Eventually, Ansari merged his Quami Ekta Dal with BSP in 2017, and won the state elections as a BSP candidate from the Mau assembly seat. He defeated his nearest rival Mahendra Rajbhar of Suheldev Bharatiya Samaj Party (a BJP ally) by 6464 votes.

Positions held
Mukhtar Ansari has been elected 5 times as MLA from Mau constituency.

Arrest 
In December 2022, he was arrested by the Enforcement Directorate in a money laundering case.

See also
 Shaukatullah Shah Ansari
 Faridul Haq Ansari

References

Living people
21st-century Indian Muslims
Indian gangsters
Indian politicians convicted of crimes
Politicians from Ghazipur
Uttar Pradesh MLAs 2017–2022
Uttar Pradesh MLAs 2007–2012
Uttar Pradesh MLAs 2012–2017
Criminals from Uttar Pradesh
Inmates of Tihar Jail
Bahujan Samaj Party politicians from Uttar Pradesh
Quami Ekta Dal politicians
1963 births
Samajwadi Party politicians from Uttar Pradesh